Maureen E. Murphy, Ph.D., is a researcher at The Wistar Institute in Philadelphia. Her research focuses on the tumor suppressor genes p53 and the cancer survivor protein HSP70. Previously, she was a faculty member at the Fox Chase Cancer Center from 1998 until moving to The Wistar Institute in 2011.

Education and career
Murphy obtained her B.Sc. in biochemistry from Rutgers University in 1987 and her Ph.D. in Molecular Biology from the Perelman School of Medicine at the University of Pennsylvania in 1993. She performed her post-doctoral work in the lab of Dr. Arnold J. Levine at Princeton University. She was a faculty member at the Fox Chase Cancer Center from 1998 until moving to the Wistar Institute in 2011.

Research
Murphy's research on p53 has focused on various genetic polymorphisms, or genetic variants, of p53 that exist in different populations, and which impair the ability of p53 to suppress cancer in those populations. In particular, her laboratory works on the P47S (Pro47Ser) and Y107H (Tyr107His) variants that exist in African-descent populations, and on the G334R (Gly334Arg) variant that exists in individuals of Ashkenazi descent.  Using human cell lines and mouse models for these variants, her research indicates that these variants predispose to cancer risk. Murphy has also discovered anti-cancer agents that preferentially destroy tumors containing these variants in a personalized medicine approach. In addition, Murphy's research provides a possible explanation as to why certain types of cancer affect certain populations.

Memberships and affiliations
Murphy serves on the international committee of the International p53 Workshop and served as co-chair of the workshop in 2010.

Select publications
 
 
 
 
 
 Azzam GA, Wang X, Bell DA and Murphy ME.  CSF1 is a novel p53 target gene whose protein product functions in a feed-forward manner to suppress apoptosis and enhance p53-mediated growth arrest.  PLoS One, in press.
 Budina-Kolomets A, Hontz RD, Pimkina J, Murphy ME. A conserved domain in exon 2 coding for the human and murine ARF tumor suppressor protein is required for autophagy induction. Autophagy 2013; Aug 7;9(10).
 Murphy ME. The HSP70 family and cancer. Carcinogenesis 2013; 34(6):1181-8.
 Balaburski GM, Leu JI, Beeharry N, Hayik S, Andrake MD, Zhang G, Herlyn M, Villanueva J, Dunbrack RL Jr, Yen T, George DL, Murphy ME.  A modified HSP70 inhibitor shows broad activity as an anticancer agent. Mol Cancer Res 2013;11(3):219-29.
 Leu JI, Pimkina J, Pandey P, Murphy ME, George DL.  HSP70 inhibition by the small-molecule 2-phenylethynesulfonamide impairs protein clearance pathways in tumor cells. Mol Cancer Res. 2011; 9:936-47.

References

External links
Dr. Murphy's lab page on The Wistar Institute's website

Cancer researchers
Living people
Year of birth missing (living people)